This article is about a structure in Winterset, Iowa. For the building commonly called Clark Tower in Memphis, Tennessee, see Clark Tower Executive Suites

Clark Tower is a castle-like limestone tower located in Winterset City Park in Winterset, Iowa, United States. It was erected in 1926, on the eightieth anniversary of the founding of Madison County, in memory of Caleb Clark, a stonemason who was the first white settler of Madison County, and his wife Ruth Clanton Clark. The tower stands at a height of 25 feet.

On March 5, 2022, Clark Tower was struck by a powerful EF4 Tornado during the Tornado outbreak of March 5–7, 2022, but survived.

References

External links
Madison County's official brief on the Clark Tower
Satellite image of the Clark Tower from Google Maps

Buildings and structures in Madison County, Iowa
Towers in Iowa
Monuments and memorials in Iowa
Tourist attractions in Madison County, Iowa
Towers completed in 1926
Winterset, Iowa
1926 establishments in Iowa